Cunneen is a surname. Notable people with the surname include:

 Dan Cunneen (born 1963), American musician
 James Cunneen (1826–1889), Australian politician
 Jim Cunneen, American politician
 John Cunneen (1848–1907), American lawyer and politician
 John Cunneen (bishop) (1932–2010), New Zealand prelate
 Margaret Cunneen (born 1959), Australian barrister and prosecutor
 Paddy Cunneen (born 1936), Irish retired hurler
 Peter Cunneen (1926–2007), Australian speedway driver
 Shannon Cunneen (born 1977), Australian cricket player

Anglicised Irish-language surnames